ABMT may refer to:

 Anti-Ballistic Missile Treaty
 Autologous bone marrow transplant, a part of High-dose chemotherapy and bone marrow transplant
 American Board of Medical Toxicology, a precursor to the American College of Medical Toxicology